Rubrobacter xylanophilus is a thermophilic species of bacteria. It is slightly halotolerant, short rod- and coccus-shaped and gram-positive, with type strain PRD-1T. It is the only true radiation resistant thermophile. It can degrade xylan and hemicellulose. The first strain of the genus Rubrobacter was isolated from gamma-irradiated hot spring water samples by Yoshinaka. This organism was found to be extremely gamma-radiation resistant, with a higher shoulder dose than the canonical radiation resistant species of the genus Deinococcus. The organism stained Gram-positive and was slightly thermophilic with an optimum growth temperature of about 60 °C.

References

Further reading

External links

LPSN
Type strain of Rubrobacter xylanophilus at BacDive -  the Bacterial Diversity Metadatabase

Rubrobacterales
Bacteria described in 1996
Thermophiles